The Subprefecture of Casa Verde is one of 32 subprefectures of the city of São Paulo, Brazil.  It comprises three districts: Casa Verde, Cachoeirinha, and Limão.

References

Subprefectures of São Paulo